The 1984 Bavarian Tennis Championships was a men's Grand Prix Tennis Circuit tournament held in Munich, West Germany which was played on outdoor clay courts. It was the 68th edition of the tournament and was held form 14 May through 20 May 1984. Libor Pimek won the singles title.

Finals

Singles

 Libor Pimek defeated  Gene Mayer 6–4, 4–6, 7–6, 6–4
 It was Pimek's 1st title of the year and the 2nd of his career.

Doubles

 Boris Becker /  Wojtek Fibak defeated  Eric Fromm /  Florin Segărceanu 6–4, 4–6, 6–1
 It was Becker's only title of the year and the 1st of his career. It was Fibak's 1st title of the year and the 58th of his career.

References

External links 
 ATP tournament profile
 

 
Bavarian International Tennis Championships
Bavarian Tennis Championships
Bavarian Tennis Championships
Bavarian Tennis Championships
German